The Moskalyev SAM-2, alternatively known as the MU-3, was a Soviet two seat introductory training flying boat tested in 1931. It was not chosen for production.

Design and development
The SAM-2 was an extensive modification of the Grigorovich MU-2, MU standing for morskoi uchyebnyi or marine trainer. It retained the pusher configuration biplane layout, its open, side-by-side cockpit and many components. New features were an improved hull underside, or planing bottom, smaller wings and a much lighter structure.

Operational history
It was completed in February 1931 and was officially tested in the spring. These led to its abandonment in favour of the parasol wing Shavrov Sh-2 amphibian which was built in large numbers, some active as late as 1964.

Specifications

References

Single-engined pusher aircraft
Flying boats
Trainer aircraft
1930s Soviet military trainer aircraft
Moskalyev aircraft